Uzunburun is a village in the Dikili ilçe (district) of the İzmir Province, Turkey.  At  it is situated to the east of Dikili . As of 2011, the population of Uzunburun was 146 people.

References

Villages in Dikili District